

About
Shingle Creek is a small waterway in central Florida that is generally considered to be the northernmost headwaters of the Everglades watershed.  It is named after the cypress trees that lined the bank in the late 19th century, which were used to make wood shingles.  The stream and surrounding areas are protected wetlands.

The creek begins in a swamp area in southern Orange County, a few miles east of the International Drive tourist corridor and west of John Young Parkway.  From there, it flows south under the Beachline Expressway, Central Florida GreeneWay and Osceola Parkway to Kissimmee in Osceola County, where it turns directly east and flows into Lake Tohopekaliga, then into the Kissimmee River system to south Florida and the Everglades.

Name associations include the Shingle Creek Fishing, Shingle Creek Resort, Shingle Creek Elementary School, and the Shingle Creek Toll Plaza on Osceola Parkway.

Shingle Creek Regional Park
Shingle Creek Regional Park, 456-acres, includes several old homes from the historic Shingle Creek community. The park includes   fishing, hiking trails, picnicking, play area, and restrooms. Stefee Landing has a launch onto the Designated Paddling Trail, outfitter, boardwalk and bridge. The Shingle Creek Regional Trail runs through the park, when complete it will run 32 miles from Kissimmee to Wekiwa Springs State Park in Seminole County.

Paddling Trail
Shingle Creek is a newly (2015) Florida Designated Paddling Trail. The trail totals about 7 miles from Babb Landing to Lake Tohopekaliga.

References
South Florida Water Management District, Shingle Creek

External links
Osceola County, Shingle Creek Regional Park
 Shingle Creek Paddling Trail at PaddleFlorida.net

See also 
 List of rivers of Florida

Rivers of Florida
Geography of Orlando, Florida
Rivers of Orange County, Florida
Rivers of Osceola County, Florida